The 1920 Denver Pioneers football team was an American football team that represented the University of Denver as a member of the Rocky Mountain Conference (RMC) during the 1920 college football season. In their first season under head coach Fred J. Murphy, the Pioneers compiled a 2–4 record, tied for fifth place in the RMC, and were outscored by a total of 82 to 46.

Schedule

References

Denver
Denver Pioneers football seasons
Denver Pioneers football